Dmitry Ivanovich Pisarev ( – ) was a Russian literary critic and philosopher who was a central figure of Russian nihilism. He is noted as a forerunner of Nietzschean philosophy and for the impact his advocacy of liberation movements and natural science had on Russian history.

A critique of his philosophy became the subject of Fyodor Dostoevsky's celebrated novel Crime and Punishment. Indeed, Pisarev's philosophy embraces the nihilist aims of negation and value-destruction; in freeing oneself from all human and moral authority, the nihilist becomes ennobled above the common masses and free to act according to sheer personal preference and usefulness. These new types, as Pisarev termed them, were to be pioneers of what he saw as the most necessary step for human development, namely the reset and destruction of the existing mode of thought. Among his most famous locutions is: "What can be smashed must be smashed. Whatever withstands the blow is fit to survive; what flies into pieces is rubbish. In any case, strike out right and left, no harm can come of it."

Pisarev wrote most of his works while imprisoned. He was arrested for political crimes the year after graduating university and drowned only two years after his release, aged 27. It is unknown whether his death was accidental or suicide as he had also suffered severe mental health issues throughout his life. His works had a deep influence throughout Russia on revolutionaries such as Lenin, anti-nihilists such as Dostoevsky, and scientists such as the Nobel prize-winner Ivan Pavlov.

Biography 

Dmitry Pisarev was born in Znamenskoye in the west of the Russian Empire, into a family of the landed aristocracy. He graduated from a gymnasium in Saint Petersburg in 1856, and in the same year began studying history and philology at Saint Petersburg Imperial University. He began writing as a literary critic for a women's liberal journal called Rassavet in 1858 while he was still a student. From 1859 to 1860 he suffered a severe mental breakdown and attempted suicide at least twice. He was committed to a mental asylum for four months after which he resumed his work and studies. As a critic, he came into contact with the writings of radicals such as Nikolay Dobrolyubov and Nikolay Chernyshevsky, as well as their mentors and followers. He became enthralled with this modern wave of literature, stating that it "forced me out of my confined cell into the fresh air." He graduated in 1861, the same year as serfdom was abolished and the first major student demonstrations were held in Saint Petersburg, by which time he had thoroughly adopted the nihilist outlook and abandoned his Orthodox Christian faith.

After graduation he worked as editor for various publications. He was arrested in 1862 for anti-government writings and was imprisoned until 1866. After his release, he continued his literary work.

During the summer holidays of 1868 he died as a result of a drowning accident at Dubulti on the Gulf of Riga (in present-day Latvia).

Legacy 

Pisarev was one of the writers who propelled the democratic-revolutionary trend in Russia during the 1860s. The next generation of Russians, made famous by the events of 1905 and 1917, acknowledged Pisarev's influence. Nadezhda Krupskaya, Lenin's wife, once wrote, "Lenin was of the generation that grew up under the influence of Pisarev".

Pisarev was also noted for his support of Russian natural science, particularly biology, and his works greatly influenced the career choice of the young Ivan Pavlov. He considered himself a positivist, although his incorporation of imagination and style somewhat contradicted that school of thought. He did not believe in romantic ideas because they reminded him of the oppressive tsarist government under which he lived. His basic beliefs were "an extreme anti-aesthetic scientistic position." He focused his efforts on defining the relation between literature and the environment.

Pisarev wanted, more than anything else, for his readers to learn to think independently. This desire he pursued through philosophy, literary criticism and social and family analyses.

Influence on Lenin 

Lenin, in the fifth chapter of What Is To Be Done?, quoted these lines from an article by Pisarev:

According to the recollection of Menshevik Georgiy Solomon, who held offices in the Soviet government from 1918 until he became a nevozvrashchenets in 1923, Lenin once quoted in a private conversation to him the following from Pisarev, with "a purely sadistic expression" and in an apparent "fit of hysteria": "Break, beat up everything, beat and destroy! Everything that's being broken is rubbish and has no right to life! What survives is good." Lenin allegedly used this quote in response to Solomon's remark that the activities of the Bolsheviks in power had a primarily destructive nature, and then threatened Solomon with the Cheka if he were to object to him again.

Works

Translated works in English

Notes

References

Sources

External links 
 

1840 births
1868 deaths
People from Lipetsk Oblast
People from Yeletsky Uyezd
Russian nobility
Russian nihilists
Journalists from the Russian Empire
Literary critics from the Russian Empire
Male writers from the Russian Empire
Russian male journalists
19th-century journalists
19th-century male writers from the Russian Empire
Prisoners of the Peter and Paul Fortress